William Ellis Brown Jr. (May 1, 1896December 8, 1970) was a Michigan politician.

Early life
Brown was born on May 1, 1896 in Lapeer, Michigan to parents William E. Brown Sr. and Grace Brown.

Military career
Brown served in the United States Army during World War I.

Career
Brown was an automobile dealer and worked in the insurance business. Brown served as the mayor of Ann Arbor, Michigan from 1945 until 1957, when he was not re-elected. Brown was a Republican.

Personal life
Brown married Eleanor Shartel on October 12, 1920. Brown was a member of the Benevolent and Protective Order of Elks. Brown was Presbyterian.

Death
Brown died on December 8, 1970. He was interred at Forest Hill Cemetery in Ann Arbor, Michigan.

References

1896 births
1970 deaths
Michigan Republicans
Presbyterians from Michigan
20th-century Presbyterians
People from Lapeer, Michigan
Military personnel from Michigan
Burials in Michigan
United States Army personnel of World War I
Mayors of Ann Arbor, Michigan
20th-century American politicians